City Hunters is a 2019 Burmese action film, directed by Nyan Htin starring Khar Ra, Yan Aung, Zin Wine, Pyae Wade Maung, Min Myat Soe San, Khant Nyar, Ja Seng Ing, Hein Thit Sa and Han Nway. The film, produced by Bonanza Film Production premiered in Myanmar on March 1, 2019.

Cast
Khar Ra as Sai Lon
Pyae Wade Maung as Mabel Latt
Yan Aung as U Thite Htun
Zin Wine as U Naung Ye Latt
Min Myat Soe San as Nay Myo
Khant Nyar as Sai Naung
Ja Seng Ing as Jenny Wong
Hein Thit Sa as Daniel Latt
Han Nway as Darli

References

2019 films
2010s Burmese-language films
Burmese action films
Films shot in Myanmar